Common plantar digital nerves can refer to:
 Common plantar digital nerves of medial plantar nerve (nervi digitales plantares communes nervi plantaris medialis)
 Common plantar digital nerves of lateral plantar nerve (nervi digitales plantares communes nervi plantaris lateralis)